Tecklenburg is a German habitational surname from a place so called in North Rhine-Westphalia. Notable people with the surname include:

 John Tecklenburg (born 1955), American businessman and politician
 Martina Voss-Tecklenburg (born 1967), retired German football midfielder
 Sam Tecklenburg (born 1997), American football center 
 Warwick Tecklenburg (born 1987), former South African rugby union player

German-language surnames
German toponymic surnames